Rubicon is the sixth full-length album by the Norwegian band Tristania. It is the first Tristania album to feature female Italian vocalist Mariangela Demurtas, who replaced former frontwoman Vibeke Stene.

Overview 
The album displays a different lineup from the previous album. It is the first Tristania album to feature Mariangela Demurtas on female vocals, Kjetil Nordhus on clean vocals, Gyri Smørdal Losnegaard on guitars, Ole Vistnes on bass, and Tarald Lie Jr. on drums. It's also the first album with harsh vocals that are performed entirely by guitarist Anders Høyvik Hidle. Pete Johansen made a guest appearance on violin after a nearly ten-year absence. Singer Østen Bergøy appeared as a session member, after scaling back to part-time membership in the band due to family commitments.

The first video of the album was for the song "Year of the Rat," released on 12 August 2010.

Track listing

Charts

Release history

Personnel

Tristania
Mariangela Demurtas – Vocals
Kjetil Nordhus – Vocals
Anders Høyvik Hidle – Guitars & Harsh Vocals
Ole Vistnes – Bass / Backing Vocals
Gyri Smørdal Losnegaard – Guitars
Einar Moen – Synths / Programming
Tarald Lie Jr. – Drums

Session members
Østen Bergøy – clean vocals
Pete Johansen – violin
Sigmund Olgart Vegge – additional harsh vocals on "Vulture"

Production
Drums recorded in Tanken Studio, Oslo by Fredrik Wallumrød, January 2010
Guitars, bass and violin recorded in K-Lab Studio, Stavanger by Anders Høyvik Hidle & Ole Vistnes, February 2010
Vocals recorded in Amadeus Studio, Oslo by Sigmund Olgart Vegge & Waldemar Sorychta, February & March 2010
Mixed by Waldemar Sorychta and Dennis Koehne in Flying Pigs Studio, April 2010
Mastered by Svante Forsbäck @ Chartmakers (www.chartmakers.fi), May 2010
Produced by Anders Høyvik Hidle & Ole Vistnes
Co-produced by Waldemar Sorychta
All songs arranged by Waldemar Sorychta and Tristania
Published by Sony ATV Publishing © 2010
Photos and front cover artwork by angst-im-wald (www.angst-im-wald.com)
Booklet design by Tinko Georgiev

References

2010 albums
Tristania (band) albums
Napalm Records albums
Albums produced by Waldemar Sorychta